Margaret Hillert (January 22, 1920 – October 11, 2014) was an American author, poet and educator. Hillert, a lifelong resident of the state of Michigan, was known for her children's literature, having written over eighty books for beginning readers.  She began writing poetry at a young age and published her first verses in 1961.

Hillert was born in Saginaw, Michigan in 1920. She was best known for her Dear Dragon series, which pairs tales of a young boy and his pet dragon with instructional notes, word lists, and activities to promote reading skills. By using limited vocabulary and repeating words, her books are aimed at helping beginning readers gain skills and confidence. Hillert's work has been illustrated by Ed Young, Nan Brooks, Kelly Oechsli, Kinuko Y. Craft, and Dick Martin.

Hillert received a nursing degree from the University of Michigan and a teaching degree from Wayne State University. She taught First Grade at Whittier Elementary in the Royal Oak Public School District for 34 years. She died on October 11, 2014 at the age of 94.

Awards 
 1991 Annual Award of the Children's Reading Round Table of Chicago
 1993 The Women's National Book Association Michigan Bookwoman of the Year
 1997 The Women of Wayne State “Headliner”
 David W Longe Prize

Bibliography 
 Come Play with Me (1975) (Illustrated by Kinuko Y. Craft)
 What Is It? (1977) (Illustrated by Kinuko Y. Craft)
 The Cookie House (1978) (Illustrated by Kinuko Y. Craft)
 The Snow Baby (1969) (Illustrated by Liz Dauber)

References

External links 
The Margaret Hillert Papers in the de Grummond Children's Literature Collection of the University of Southern Mississippi

American children's writers
Writers from Michigan
1920 births
2014 deaths
University of Michigan School of Nursing alumni
People from Saginaw, Michigan
Wayne State University alumni